First Presbyterian Church Rectory is a historic Presbyterian church rectory located at Poughkeepsie, Dutchess County, New York.  It was built about 1857 and is a -story brick dwelling on a raised basement in the Second Empire style.  It is five bays wide and features a bellcast mansard roof.

It was added to the National Register of Historic Places in 1982.  The related church was added at the same time.

References

Churches on the National Register of Historic Places in New York (state)
Second Empire architecture in New York (state)
Churches completed in 1857
Churches in Dutchess County, New York
National Register of Historic Places in Poughkeepsie, New York
1857 establishments in New York (state)